The Culinary Heritage of Switzerland is a multilingual online encyclopedia of traditional Swiss cuisine and produce.

History
The project was initiated after Swiss MP Josef Zisyadis's parliamentary motion in 2000. After obtaining CHF 2 million of funding by the Swiss federal government, the Swiss cantons and private sponsors, the private association "Culinary Heritage of Switzerland" was founded in 2003.

The association hired a team of researchers, including ethnologists and historians, to write the articles and carry out field research by interviewing Swiss bakers, butchers, cultural historians, archivists and farmer's wives. It made the encyclopedia, with an initial scope of some 400 articles, available to the public on 9 December 2008 at no charge.

Scope
To be included in the association's database, a food must be recognised as traditionally Swiss, have been produced for at least 40 years and remain in production. The project's scope is limited to processed foodstuffs, such as cheeses or meat products. It does not include unprocessed food (with a few exceptions), wines, recipes or dishes.

See also
Appellation d'origine protégée (Switzerland)

Notes and references

External links

 
Swiss cuisine
Swiss online encyclopedias